Newport City Radio is a community radio station serving the city of Newport, in south east Wales. It broadcasts online via its website and the TuneIn service. It was previously named Urban Circle Radio.

History 

The station was launched in 2007 by Ali Boshk. It remains the only community radio station in the city, and was established when the station benefitted from a 3-year funding grant from the National Lottery Community Fund. The station began as part of the Urban Circle projects, a social enterprise led by young people focussed on offering broadcast media training to young people in Newport. Current Managing Director Ian Lamsdale joined the organisation in 2008.

Between 2008 and 2010 the station was broadcast on 87.9FM under an Ofcom community radio licence.

In 2011, the station refocussed following the end of its grant funding. The organisation already engaged with a diverse range of people across the city, and stated on its website that it would change direction to aim to "(empower) people of all ages, all abilities with training and development in radio broadcasting". It was also in 2011 that the organisation registered on the Mutuals Register as a Community Interest Company.

Current activities 
The station now has 50 active volunteers broadcasting to a 100,000 plus population in the region. The station can often be seen at events in the city, such as Newport County and Dragons sporting events, major entertainment and cultural occasions, and the 2019 Record Store Day in the city.

Each year the station organises the Love Live Music Song Contest, aimed at exposing local songwriters and composers to a wider audience, with an awards night held at The NEON each year.

In 2017, the station took part in #WeStandTogether, an event held in tribute to the victims of the Manchester Arena bombing, alongside Newport City Council, SEWREC, and the Islamic Society of Wales, with the occasion led particularly by young people and families of the same age as those who were victims of the attack. Young people from the station provided a live music set and words of reflection.

References

External links 

 Newport City Radio website
 NCR - Twitter
 NCR - Facebook
 Newport City Radio on TuneIn
 Community Media Association website
 Ofcom website

Community radio stations in the United Kingdom
Radio stations established in 2007
Urban adult contemporary radio stations
2007 establishments in Wales
Community interest companies in Wales
Community interest companies